Latin Lover is a 2015 Italian comedy-drama film written and directed by Cristina Comencini. It marked the last cinema appearance of Virna Lisi.  The film received four nominations at the 2015 David di Donatello Awards, for best actress (Lisi), best costumes (Alessandro Lai), best makeup (Ermanno Spera) and best hairstyling (Alberta Giuliani).

Plot

Upon the tenth anniversary of the death of fictional film star Saverio Crispo, his four daughters get together in the family manor in Apulia, Southern Italy. As Saverio used to be at the top of his game as an internationally known film star, he had liaisons with different women across the world, thus having several love children. His children include his Italian daughter, Susanna, who is secretly engaged to Walter, the former editor of Saverio's latest movies, his French daughter, Stéphanie, a mother of three sons from different men, his Spanish daughter, Segunda, the only one being married, and his youngest daughter, Solveig, from Sweden, who had little to no contact with her late father. None of the four women got to really know their late father, but each of them has fabricated an idealized and very personal memory of him.

Saverio's two widows, the Italian-born Rita and the Spanish-born Ramona, are also present at the family reunion. The meeting happens as Saverio's hometown celebrates the late actor's life and achievements, but apparently many secrets are yet to be unveiled about his life and his family.

Cast 

Virna Lisi as Rita
Marisa Paredes as Ramona
Valeria Bruni Tedeschi as Stéphanie
Angela Finocchiaro as  Susanna 
Candela Peña as Segunda
Pihla Viitala as  Solveig
 Nadeah Miranda as  Shelley
Francesco Scianna as  Saverio Crispo
Jordi Mollà as  Alfonso
Neri Marcorè as  Walter
Claudio Gioè as  Marco Serra
Lluís Homar as  Pedro
Toni Bertorelli as  Picci

Trivia 

Final film of Virna Lisi.  She was already very ill from cancer during production and died shortly after.  The film is dedicated to her in the end credit.

See also   
 List of Italian films of 2015

References

External links 

2015 films
2015 comedy-drama films
Films directed by Cristina Comencini
Italian comedy-drama films
2010s Italian films